Kojo Asemanyi is a Ghanaian politician and member of the Seventh Parliament of the Fourth Republic of Ghana representing the Gomoa East Constituency in the Central Region on the ticket of the New Patriotic Party. An Elder of the Church of Pentecost and a Christian, he is a father. He is currently the Mayor of Cape Coast.

Early life and education 
Asemanyi was born on 10 September 1979 and hails from Gomoa Buduatta in the Central Region of Ghana. He had his Higher National Diploma from the Cape Coast Polytechnic. He had his Bachelors' degree in Management Studies from the University of Cape Coast in 2011. He further had his Masters' degree in Public Administration in the University of Phoenix in Arizona in USA.

Career 
Asemanyi worked at the US Postal Service as a Rural Carrier Associate in Delaware in USA from 2013 to 2016. He was also a Program Officer at World Vision Ghana from 2005 to 2008. He was also a Sales supervisor for Tigo from 2008 to 2012. He was also a Production Associate for Nixon Uniforms from 2012 to 2013.

Politics 
Asemanyi is a member of the New Patriotic Party. He contested in the NPP primaries election and won against Dr Marqus Yaw Danso. He is the former Member of Parliament for Gomoa East Constituency in the Central Region.

2016 election 
He defeated Desmond De-Graft Paitoo in the 2016 Ghanaian general election to win the Gomoa East Constituency parliamentary seat. He won with 17,654 votes making 50.0% of the total votes cast whilst Desmond had 15,010 votes making 42.5% of the total votes cast, an Independent candidate Marcus Yaw Danso who had 1,604 votes making 4.5% of the total votes cast, Eunice Assuman of PPP who also had 920 votes making 2.6% of the total votes cast and Godfred Kumedzro Cudjo of CPP had 105 votes making 0.3% of the total votes cast.

Committee 
Asemanyi was the Deputy Chairman of Parliamentary Select Committee on Sports.

2020 election 
Asemanyi lost the Gomoa East Constituency parliamentary seat during the 2020 Ghanaian general elections to the NDC parliamentary candidate Desmond De-Graft Paitoo. He lost with 35,873 votes making 48.4% of the total votes cast whilst Desmond had 36,637 votes making 49.5% of the total votes cast, Samuel Kofi Essel of GUM who had 1,397 votes making 1.89% of the total votes cast and Emmanuel Otchere of UPP who also had 173 votes making 0.23% of the total votes cast.

Personal life 
Asemanyi is a Christian.

Philanthropy 
In June 2017, he presented about 15 hospital beds to the Gomoa Nyanyano Health Center, Buduatta Health Center and the Ojobi Health Center in the Central Region.

In June 2019, Asemanyi presented about 35,000 liters of premix fuel to about 2,300 fishermen in the Central Region of Ghana.

In December 2019 during the Farmer's and Fisher's Day Celebration in Gomoa East, he presented a tricycle to the best farmer.

References

Ghanaian MPs 2017–2021
1979 births
Living people
New Patriotic Party politicians
University of Cape Coast alumni
University of Phoenix alumni
People from Central Region (Ghana)